T2 (also known as Tenement 2) is a 2009 Filipino supernatural horror film directed by Chito S. Roño and starring Maricel Soriano. "T2" refers to Tenement 2, one of the buildings in Brgy. Western Bicutan, Taguig City where some of the scenes were shot. In the film, Maricel Soriano plays a Save an Orphan Foundation volunteer who brings an orphan home only to discover that the girl comes from a family of Engkantos.

Produced and distributed by Star Cinema, the film was released on April 11, 2009.

Plot
Claire and Elias pick up Angeli, who is scheduled to be adopted. Upon arriving at Tenement 2, where Angeli's new parents are staying, they only find Tess, Melissa and Domeng. Angeli pleads Claire to not leave her no matter what happens, and writes a letter to her which is not to be read until a specified time.

As Elias searches for the sleeping Angeli and Claire, he is attacked and killed by entities. Claire wakes up to find Angeli missing and searches for her only to find Elias' corpse. She then finds Angeli being possessed only to be awaken back to her consciousness through Claire's presence. Angeli pleads again Claire not to leave her and decide to escape the building but are overwhelmed and separated by a huge swarm of rats summoned by the entities. Claire is saved by a mysterious lady using her magic lamp. The lady then tells her to run quickly and be ready before midnight (which is three in the morning for the entities, which was revealed are Fairies).

Angeli is taken by the fairies while the lady explains to Claire the truth about Angeli and the fairies. She reveals that she too had a child with a fairy whom she raised in the human world but was taken by the fairies to their world when she reached the age of nine as per the fairies' customs. The lady tells Claire not to let Angeli be taken away as it is believed that love nor emotion do not exist in the fairy world. Both decided to go back where Angeli's room and find her letters as they encounter monsters on their way to the fairy world, where the lady finally finds her child, who rejects her believing that she doesn't have any family in their dimension.

Isabel, one of the fairies, introduces herself as Angeli's mother and tells Angeli's backstory. Claire's husband Jeremy searches for Claire in the building as everyone awaits for Angeli's decision. But before she decides, she is confronted by Claire who reads the letters and memories of her life with her human father who was be blinded after the apparent death of her fairy wife, which occurred after her true identity was revealed. Angeli then breaks down remembering her father.

The fairies then challenges Claire for Angeli or Jeremy's lives. Angered, Angeli then threatens her mother that she will not join them upon reaching adulthood unless they guarantee not to harm Jeremy, to which the fairies agree. The lady then kills all the fairies using a potion before being overwhelmed by a rat swarm. They then wake up in real life being found by Jeremy.

Afterwards, Angeli is adopted by Claire and Jeremy and goes to her new school where she encounters fairies and her fairy mother, who turns out to be her teacher.

Cast

Maricel Soriano as Claire
Mika Dela Cruz as Angeli
Derek Ramsay as Jeremy
Eric Fructuoso as Elias
Tetchie Agbayani as Rita
Camille Prats as Tess
K Brosas as Melissa
Mon Confiado as Domeng
Carmen Soo as Isabel
John Lloyd Cruz as Gary
Julia Montes as Rita's daughter
Mosang as Manghihilot

See also
Star Cinema
ABS-CBN
Biringan city

References

External links

2009 films
2009 horror films
Engkanto films
Filipino-language films
Films directed by Chito S. Roño
Mosang films
Philippine horror films
Star Cinema films
2000s Tagalog-language films
2000s English-language films